Weekend Japanology, Begin Japanology, and Japanology Plus are Japanese television programs aired on NHK World, and presented by Peter Barakan. The programs explore aspects of traditional and contemporary Japan and interview experts in various fields.

The series premiered under the title Weekend Japanology, which was first broadcast in 2002 in Japan and beginning in other countries on April 6, 2003. It eventually developed into Begin Japanology (first broadcast on October 5, 2007 in Japan and in other countries on March 14, 2008) and later Japanology Plus (first broadcast April 3, 2014.) Other than the title, little has changed in the content or format.

Japanology Plus has three presenters: Peter Barakan, Matt Alt, and Emma Howard. The show also has an occasional talk series called "Japanophiles" featuring interviews with foreigners doing activities in Japan.

List of Weekend Japanology episodes

Season 1 (April 2003 - October 2004)

Season 2 (May 2005 - January 2008)

List of Begin Japanology episodes

Season 1 (April 2008 - December 2008)

Season 2 (January 2009 - December 2009)

Season 3 (January 2010 - December 2010)

Season 4 (January 2011 - December 2011)

Season 5 (January 2012 - December 2012)

Season 6 (January 2013 - December 2013)

Season 7 (January 2014 - March 2014)

List of Japanology Plus episodes

Season 1 (April 2014 - March 2016)

Season 2 (April 2016 - March 2019)

Season 3 (April 2019 - March 2021)

Season 4 (April 2021 - March 2022)

Season 5 (April 2022 - Ongoing)

References

External links
 
 
https://www.thetvdb.com/series/weekend-japanology
https://www.thetvdb.com/series/begin-japanology
https://www.thetvdb.com/series/japanology-plus

Japanese documentary television series
2002 Japanese television series debuts
2007 Japanese television series debuts
2014 Japanese television series debuts
NHK original programming